Scott Davis and Tim Pawsat were the defending champions. Pawsat did not enter the event that year, while Davis participated alongside David Pate.Davis eventually defended his title with Pate, defeating Alfonso Mora and Brian Page 6–3, 7–6(7–5), in the final.

Seeds

Draw

Draw

References
General

1990 Prudential-Bache Securities Classic